National Highway 534, commonly referred to as NH 534, is a highway connecting the city of Najibabad to Bubakhal.

References

 Openstreetmap 

81
National highways in India